ACADM (acyl-Coenzyme A dehydrogenase, C-4 to C-12 straight chain) is a gene that provides instructions for making an enzyme called acyl-coenzyme A dehydrogenase that is important for breaking down (degrading) a certain group of fats called medium-chain fatty acids.

These fatty acids are found in foods such as milk and certain oils, and they are also stored in the body's fat tissue. Medium-chain fatty acids are also produced when larger fatty acids are degraded.

The acyl-coenzyme A dehydrogenase for medium-chain fatty acids (ACADM) enzyme is essential for converting these particular fatty acids to energy, especially during periods without food (fasting). The ACADM enzyme functions in mitochondria, the energy-producing centers within cells. It is found in the mitochondria of several types of tissues, particularly the liver.

The ACADM gene is located on the short (p) arm of chromosome 1 at position 31, from base pair 75,902,302 to base pair 75,941,203.

Structure
The protein encoded by the ACADM gene is ~47 kDa in size, and composed of 421 amino acids.

Function 
The LCAD enzyme catalyzes most of fatty acid beta-oxidation by forming a C2-C3 trans-double bond in the fatty acid. MCAD works on long-chain fatty acids, typically between C4 and C12-acylCoA. Fatty acid oxidation has proven to spare glucose in fasting conditions, and is also required for amino acid metabolism, which is essential for the maintenance of adequate glucose production. Furthermore, MCAD participates in fatty acid metabolism and PPAR signaling pathway.

Clinical significance
Medium-chain acyl-coenzyme A dehydrogenase deficiency can be caused by mutations in the ACADM gene. More than 54 ACADM gene mutations that cause medium-chain acyl-coenzyme A dehydrogenase deficiency have been identified. Many of these mutations switch an amino acid building block in the ACADM enzyme. The most common amino acid substitution replaces lysine with glutamic acid at position 329 in the enzyme's chain of amino acids (also written as Lys329Glu or K329E). This mutation and other amino acid substitutions alter the enzyme's structure, reducing or abolishing its activity. Other mutations delete or duplicate part of the ACADM gene, which leads to an unstable enzyme that cannot function.

With a shortage (deficiency) of functional ACADM enzyme, medium-chain fatty acids cannot be degraded and processed. As a result, these fats are not converted into energy, which can lead to characteristic symptoms of this disorder, such as lack of energy (lethargy) and low blood sugar. Levels of medium-chain fatty acids or partially degraded fatty acids may build up in tissues and can damage the liver and brain, causing more serious complications.

References

Further reading

External links 
  GeneReviews/NIH/NCBI/UW entry on Medium-Chain Acyl-Coenzyme A Dehydrogenase Deficiency
 GeneCard
ACADM at The GDB Human Genome Database